Gradski stadion is a football stadium in Bijelo Polje, Montenegro. It is currently used for football matches and is the home ground of FK Jedinstvo, FK Tekstilac and OFK Borac. The stadium holds 4,000 people.

History
FK Jedinstvo played home games at the location of Gradski stadion since 1945. Following promotion of FK Jedinstvo to First League of Serbia and Montenegro, the stadium was renovated in 2005, with 3,000 seats on the main stand and 1,000 seats on the other stand.

Pitch and conditions
The pitch measures 110 x 70 meters. The stadium didn't met UEFA criteria for European competitions. At the north side of stadium is situated indoor sports hall 'Nikoljac'.

See also
FK Jedinstvo Bijelo Polje
FK Tekstilac
OFK Borac Bijelo Polje
FK Fair Play Bijelo Polje
Bijelo Polje

External links
 Stadium information

References 

Multi-purpose stadiums in Montenegro
Football venues in Montenegro
Football in Montenegro
Bijelo Polje